The Paragon and La Petite were automobiles produced by the Detroit Automobile Manufacturing Company in Detroit, Michigan from 1905 to 1907.

History 

J. P. La Vigne built his first automobile in 1898, and with his daughter Olive continued with experimental cars and other inventions until 1905 when the Detroit Automobile Manufacturing Company was set-up.  The factory at 284–290 Rivard Street in Detroit first produced the La Petite which was displayed at the Detroit Automobile Show.  J. P. La Vigne was unhappy with his engine manufacturer and left the company.

Detroit Automobile Manufacturing change the name of the car to Paragon and produced it through 1906.  The La Petite and Paragon were a small two-seat runabout weighing only 650 pounds.  They were equipped with a 0.7 liter, single-cylinder 5-hp engine and sold for $375, .  The only difference between the two was La Petite had a 65-inch wheelbase and the Paragon was 68-inches.

See also 
 1905 Paragon at the AACA Museum in Hershey, PA

References

Defunct motor vehicle manufacturers of the United States
Motor vehicle manufacturers based in Michigan
Defunct manufacturing companies based in Michigan
Brass Era vehicles
1900s cars
Cars introduced in 1905
Vehicle manufacturing companies established in 1905
Vehicle manufacturing companies disestablished in 1907